Topojan is a village and a former municipality in Kukës County, Albania. It became a subdivision of the municipality Kukës at the 2015 local government reform. The population at the 2011 census was 1,753.

Notable people
 Koca Sinan Pasha- Ottoman Grand Vizier

References

Former municipalities in Kukës County
Administrative units of Kukës
Villages in Kukës County